Relander is a surname. Notable people with the surname include:

Kaj-Erik Relander, Finnish businessman and investor
Lauri Kristian Relander (1883–1942), Finnish politician and 2nd President of Finland
Signe Relander (1886-1962), wife of Lauri Kristian Relander
Sven Relander (1897–1956), Finnish actor

See also
Reylander
Rylander